The 2023 World Men's Curling Championship (branded as 2023 BKT Tires & OK Tire World Men's Curling Championship for sponsorship reasons) will be held April 1 to 9 at the TD Place in Ottawa, Canada Ottawa was selected as the host site in June 2022. It had originally been planned for the city to host the event in 2021, but the event was moved to the "Calgary bubble" due to the COVID-19 pandemic. This will be the first time Ottawa has hosted the men's Worlds.

The format for the Championship featured a thirteen team round robin. The top six teams qualified for the playoff round where the top two teams received a bye while the remaining four played the first round.

Qualification
Thirteen curling federations qualified to participate in the 2023 World Men's Curling Championship. This is the first World Men's Championship appearance for Turkey, being represented by skip Uğurcan Karagöz.

Selection of national teams

Teams
The teams were as follows:

{| class="wikitable"
!width=250|
!width=250|
!width=250|
!width=250|
!width=250|
|-
|St. John's CC, St. John's
Skip: Brad Gushue
Third: Mark Nichols
Second: E. J. Harnden
Lead: Geoff Walker
Alternate: Ryan Harnden
|CC Zbraslav, Zbraslav
Skip: Lukáš Klíma
Third: Marek Černovský
Second: Radek Boháč
Lead: Martin Jurík
Alternate: Lukáš Klípa|Baden Hills G&CC, FüssenSkip: Sixten Totzek
Third: Klaudius Harsch
Second: Magnus Sutor
Lead: Dominik Greindl
Alternate: Marc Muskatewitz|Torino-Pinerolo CC, Pinerolo &  Aeronautica MilitareSkip: Joël Retornaz
Third: Amos Mosaner
Second: Sebastiano Arman
Lead: Mattia Giovanella
|SC Karuizawa Club, KaruizawaSkip: Riku Yanagisawa
Third: Tsuyoshi Yamaguchi
Second: Takeru Yamamoto
Lead: Satoshi Koizumi
Alternate: Shingo Usui|-
!width=250|
!width=250|
!width=250|
!width=250|
!width=250|
|-
|Naseby Indoor Curling Rink, NasebySkip: Anton Hood
Third: Ben Smith
Second: Brett Sargon
Lead: Hunter Walker
Alternate: Peter de Boer|Trondheim CK, TrondheimSkip: Magnus Ramsfjell
Third: Martin Sesaker
Second: Bendik Ramsfjell
Lead: Gaute Nepstad
Alternate: Wilhelm Næss|Gogar Park CC, EdinburghSkip: Bruce Mouat
Third: Grant Hardie
Second: Bobby Lammie
Lead: Hammy McMillan Jr.
Alternate: Kyle Waddell|Seoul CC, SeoulSkip: Jeong Byeong-jin
Third: Lee Jeong-jae
Second: Kim Min-woo
Lead: Kim Tae-hwan
|Karlstads CK, KarlstadSkip: Niklas Edin
Third: Oskar Eriksson
Second: Rasmus Wranå
Lead: Christoffer Sundgren
Alternate: Daniel Magnusson|-
!width=250|
!width=250|
!width=250|
!width=250|
!width=250|
|-
|CC Genève, GenevaFourth: Benoît Schwarz
Skip: Yannick Schwaller
Second: Sven Michel
Lead: Pablo Lachat
||Milli Piyango CA, ErzurumSkip: Uğurcan Karagöz
Third: Muhammet Haydar Demirel
Second: Muhammed Zeki Uçan
Lead: Orhun Yüce
Alternate: Faruk Kavaz|Duluth CC, Duluth, MinnesotaSkip: John Shuster
Third: Chris Plys
Second: Matt Hamilton
Lead: John Landsteiner
Alternate: Colin Hufman|
|
|}

Round robin standings

Round robin results

All draw times are listed in Eastern Time (UTC−04:00).

 Draw 1 Saturday, April 1, 2:00 pm Draw 2 Saturday, April 1, 7:00 pm Draw 3 Sunday, April 2, 9:00 am Draw 4 Sunday, April 2, 2:00 pm Draw 5 Sunday, April 2, 7:00 pm Draw 6 Monday, April 3, 9:00 am Draw 7 Monday, April 3, 2:00 pm Draw 8 Monday, April 3, 7:00 pm Draw 9 Tuesday, April 4, 9:00 am Draw 10 Tuesday, April 4, 2:00 pm Draw 11 Tuesday, April 4, 7:00 pm Draw 12 Wednesday, April 5, 9:00 am Draw 13 Wednesday, April 5, 2:00 pm Draw 14 Wednesday, April 5, 7:00 pm Draw 15 Thursday, April 6, 9:00 am Draw 16 Thursday, April 6, 2:00 pm Draw 17 Thursday, April 6, 7:00 pm Draw 18 Friday, April 7, 9:00 am Draw 19 Friday, March 24, 2:00 pm Draw 20 Friday, April 7, 7:00 pmPlayoffs

Qualification GamesSaturday, April 8, 2:00 pmSemifinalsSaturday, April 8, 7:00 pmBronze medal gameSunday, April 9, 11:00 amFinalSunday, April 9, 4:00 pm''

Notes

References

Curling in Ottawa
World Men's Curling Championship
April 2023 sports events in Canada
2023 in Ontario
2020s in Ottawa
2023 in Canadian curling
Sports competitions in Ottawa
International curling competitions hosted by Canada